Näsum is a locality situated in Bromölla Municipality, Skåne County, Sweden with 1,117 inhabitants in 2010.

References 

Populated places in Bromölla Municipality
Populated places in Skåne County